The Outer East Football Netball League is an Australian rules football and netball league stretching from the Goulburn Valley, Dandenong Ranges and western Gippsland within Victoria.

History
The league was formed with the merger of the Yarra Valley Mountain District Football League and the South East Football Netball League in 2018.

In 2020 the league admitted Broadford from the Riddell District Football League and junior club Berwick Springs. The Titans competed in the underage competition in 2019.
The 2020 season was cancelled due to government restrictions of contact sport because of the Covid pandemic.

Clubs

Premier Division

Division One

Division Two

Former Clubs

Premiers

2019 Season

Premier Division

Division One

Division Two

Records

Highest Scores

Lowest Scores

Largest Winning Margins

Highest Losing Scores

Lowest Winning Scores

References

External links
 Full Points Footy -Yarra Valley Mountain Football League
League Official Website
Local Footy Stats Fan Web Site
Australian Football - Outer East Football Netball League

2018 establishments in Australia
Sports leagues established in 2018
Australian rules football competitions in Victoria (Australia)
Yarra Valley
Netball leagues in Victoria (Australia)